Rainer "Rai" Weiss (born September 29, 1932) is an American physicist, known for his contributions in gravitational physics and astrophysics. He is a professor of physics emeritus at MIT and an adjunct professor at LSU. He is best known for inventing the laser interferometric technique which is the basic operation of LIGO. He was Chair of the COBE Science Working Group.

In 2017, Weiss was awarded the Nobel Prize in Physics, along with Kip Thorne and Barry Barish, "for decisive contributions to the LIGO detector and the observation of gravitational waves".

Weiss has helped realize a number of challenging experimental tests of fundamental physics. He is a member of the Fermilab Holometer experiment, which uses a 40m laser interferometer to measure properties of space and time at quantum scale and provide Planck-precision tests of quantum holographic fluctuation.

In a 2022 interview given to Federal University of Pará in Brazil, Weiss talks about his life and career, the memories of his childhood and youth, his undergraduate and graduate studies at the MIT and the future of gravitational waves astronomy.

Early life and education 
Rainer Weiss was born in Berlin, Germany, the son of Gertrude Loesner and Frederick A. Weiss. His father, a physician, neurologist, and psychoanalyst, was forced out of Germany by Nazis because he was Jewish and an active member of the Communist Party. His mother, an actress, was Christian. His aunt was the sociologist Hilda Weiss.  The family fled first to Prague, but Germany's occupation of Czechoslovakia after the 1938 Munich Agreement caused them to flee again; the philanthropic Stix family of St. Louis enabled them to obtain visas to enter the United States. Weiss spent his youth in New York City, where he attended Columbia Grammar School. He studied at MIT and, after dropping out during his junior year, returned to receive his S.B. degree in 1955 and Ph.D. degree in 1962 under Jerrold Zacharias.

He taught at Tufts University from 1960 to 1962, was a postdoctoral scholar at Princeton University from 1962 to 1964, and then joined the faculty at MIT in 1964.

Achievements 
Weiss brought two fields of fundamental physics research from birth to maturity: characterization of the cosmic background radiation, and interferometric gravitational wave observation.

He made pioneering measurements of the spectrum of the cosmic microwave background radiation, with a balloon experiment that made the definitive measurement showing that the microwave background exhibited the thermal spectrum characteristic of the remnant radiation from the Big Bang.  He later became co-founder and science advisor of the NASA Cosmic Background Explorer (COBE) satellite, which made detailed mapping of the radiation.

Weiss also pioneered the concept of using lasers for an interferometric gravitational wave detector, suggesting that the path length required for such a detector would necessitate kilometer-scale arms. He built a prototype in the 1970s, following earlier work by Robert L. Forward. He co-founded the NSF LIGO (gravitational-wave detection) project, which was based on his report "A study of a long Baseline Gravitational Wave Antenna System".

Both of these efforts couple challenges in instrument science with physics important to the understanding of the Universe.

In February 2016, he was one of the four scientists of LIGO/Virgo collaboration presenting at the press conference for the announcement that the first direct gravitational wave observation had been made in September 2015.

Honors and awards
Rainer Weiss has been recognized by numerous awards including:

In 2006, with John C. Mather, he and the COBE team received the Gruber Prize in Cosmology.
In 2007, with Ronald Drever, he was awarded the APS Einstein Prize for his work.
In 2016 and 2017, for the achievement of gravitational waves detection, he received:
The Special Breakthrough Prize in Fundamental Physics,
Gruber Prize in Cosmology, 
Shaw Prize, 
Kavli Prize in Astrophysics 
The Harvey Prize together with Kip Thorne and Ronald Drever.
The Smithsonian magazine's American Ingenuity Award in the Physical Science category, with Kip Thorne and Barry Barish.
The Willis E. Lamb Award for Laser Science and Quantum Optics, 2017.
 Princess of Asturias Award (2017) (jointly with Kip Thorne and Barry Barish).
 The Nobel Prize in Physics (2017) (jointly with Kip Thorne and Barry Barish)
Fellowship of the Norwegian Academy of Science and Letters
In 2018, he was awarded the American Astronomical Society's Joseph Weber Award for Astronomical Instrumentation "for his invention of the interferometric gravitational-wave detector, which led to the first detection of long-predicted gravitational waves."
In 2020 he was elected a Legacy Fellow of the American Astronomical Society.

Selected publications

Notes

References

Further reading

External links 

 Rainer Weiss's website at MIT
 LIGO Group at the MIT Kavli Institute for Astrophysics and Space Research
 
 Q&A: Rainer Weiss on LIGO's origins at news.mit.edu
 Archived at Ghostarchive and the Wayback Machine: 
  including the Nobel Lecture 8 December 2017 LIGO and Gravitational Waves I

1932 births
Living people
Nobel laureates in Physics
American Nobel laureates
American people of German-Jewish descent
21st-century American physicists
Jewish American physicists
German emigrants to the United States
Gravitational-wave astronomy
Massachusetts Institute of Technology alumni
Massachusetts Institute of Technology School of Science faculty
Members of the United States National Academy of Sciences
Members of the Norwegian Academy of Science and Letters
Columbia Grammar & Preparatory School alumni
MIT Department of Physics alumni
Kavli Prize laureates in Astrophysics
Fellows of the American Astronomical Society
Experimental physicists
Fellows of the American Physical Society